Asyat Mansurovich Saitov (born 1 January 1965) is a retired Russian cyclist. He missed the 1984 Summer Olympics due to their boycott by the Soviet Union and competed at the Friendship Games instead, winning a silver medal in the team road race. The same year he won the Tour of Greece and Olympia's Tour. He also won the GP Cuprosan in 1991, Vuelta a Castilla y León in 1992, Vuelta a Mallorca in 1993 and Gran Premio de Llodio in 1994.

In 1988 he competed at the Summer Olympics in the 100 km team time trial and in the individual road race and finished in seventh and 51st place, respectively.

He is married to Svetlana Masterkova, a Russian Olympic middle distance runner.

Major results

1984
1st  Overall Olympia's Tour
1st Stage 6
1st  Overall Tour of Greece
1986
3rd Overall Peace Race
1990
1st Stage 19 Vuelta a España
3rd Trofeo Pantalica
1992
1st  Overall Vuelta a Castilla y León
1st  Road race, National Road Championships
1st Stage 5a Tour of the Basque Country
7th Trofeo Masferrer
1993
1st Stage 5 Vuelta a Aragón
1st Stage 1 Vuelta a Mallorca
2nd Road race, National Road Championships
3rd Overall Vuelta a La Rioja
3rd Trofeo Masferrer
1994
Vuelta a Castilla y León
1st Stages 1 & 4
1st Stage 4 Route du Sud
1st Stage 1 Vuelta a La Rioja
2nd Clásica de Almería
1995
1st  Overall Volta ao Alentejo
1st Stages 1 & 2
1st  Road race, National Road Championships
1st Stage 18 Vuelta a España
1st Stage 5a Tour of the Basque Country
7th Overall Vuelta a Murcia
1996
1st Stage 13 Volta a Portugal
9th Overall Vuelta a Murcia

Grand Tour general classification results timeline

References

External links

1965 births
Living people
Russian male cyclists
Russian Vuelta a España stage winners
Olympic cyclists of the Soviet Union
Cyclists at the 1988 Summer Olympics
Sportspeople from Samara, Russia